Kilsyth Terrace is a historic series of townhouses at 15–27 Kilsyth Road in Brookline, Massachusetts.  The Chateau-style townhouses were designed by J. Williams Beal and built in 1892.  They are -story townhouses, built of yellow brick with Roxbury stone trim.  Notable features include turrets, arched entrances and corbelled brickwork.  Their design was likely influenced by the earlier Beaconsfield Terraces development, not far away on Beacon and Tappan Streets.

The building was listed on the National Register of Historic Places in 1985.

See also
National Register of Historic Places listings in Brookline, Massachusetts

References

Residential buildings on the National Register of Historic Places in Massachusetts
Houses in Brookline, Massachusetts
Houses completed in 1892
Renaissance Revival architecture in Massachusetts
National Register of Historic Places in Brookline, Massachusetts